Nathan Leon Jawai (born 10 October 1986) is an Australian professional basketball player for the Darwin Salties of the NBL1 North. Standing at 209 cm, he plays at the power forward and centre positions.

Early life
Born at the Royal Hospital for Women in the Sydney suburb of Paddington on 10 October 1986, Jawai lived in Sydney for a year before his parents, Lynette and Ron, moved back to Bamaga, a small town of about 1000 people, located north of the Jardine River and only 40 km from the tip of Cape York Peninsula. He is an Indigenous Australian of Torres Strait Islander descent. He is the cousin of NBA basketball player Patty Mills, rugby league NRL players Edrick Lee and Brenko Lee. Jawai's uncle is former Olympian basketballer Danny Morseu, the second Indigenous Australian to represent Australia at the Olympics in basketball.  Jawai’s great uncle is Indigenous land rights activist Eddie Mabo.

Like most children on Cape York, he played rugby league throughout primary school and early high school. However, living in a remote indigenous community meant Jawai was subject to a lot of bad influences and was often getting in trouble due to the stain of drug and alcohol abuse. Strong parental guidance and the decision to send Jawai to high school at St Augustine's College in Cairns ensured he stayed away from bad influences. At the age of 15, Jawai began playing basketball, and it only took him two years until he began playing competitively for the Cairns Marlins of the Queensland Basketball League in 2004. He then spent two years at the Australian Institute of Sport in Canberra before venturing to the United States in 2006 to play college basketball for Midland College. However, after just one season with Midland, Jawai returned to Australia and had surgery to remove the meniscus in his right knee. With his move back home, he had hopes of joining an NBL club. He subsequently re-joined the Cairns Marlins and helped guide them to a national title in 2007 while earning ACC All-Star Five honours.

Professional career

Cairns Taipans
Jawai's play with the Cairns Taipans' feeder team, the Cairns Marlins, earned him a spot on the Taipans roster for the 2007–08 NBL season. In 31 games for the Taipans, Jawai averaged 17.3 points, 9.4 rebounds and 1.9 assists per game. His season highs for points and rebounds was 28 and 18 respectively.

NBA
Jawai was drafted 41st overall in the 2008 NBA draft by the Indiana Pacers; however, his rights were traded to the Toronto Raptors in a deal that also brought Jermaine O'Neal to Toronto in exchange for T. J. Ford, Rasho Nesterović, Maceo Baston, and the draft rights to Roy Hibbert. On 11 July 2008, he signed a two-year deal with the Raptors, and the nicknames soon rolled in with "Aussie Shaq", "Outback Shaq" and "Baby Shaq", due to his resemblance to Shaquille O'Neal. He was also nicknamed "Big Nate" by Toronto commentators.

On 17 December 2008, Jawai was cleared to resume training after enduring a worrisome period in which he was not allowed to undergo physical activity. Jawai was required to 'rest', due to a routine pre-season test which revealed a cardiac abnormality. On 21 January 2009, Jawai made his NBA debut against the Detroit Pistons at The Palace of Auburn Hills, becoming the first indigenous Australian to play in the NBA.

On 26 February 2009, Jawai was assigned by the Raptors to the Idaho Stampede of the NBA Development League. In his first start (his second game), he registered 12 points, 5 rebounds and a team-high 3 blocks in Idaho's 104–96 win over the Utah Flash. Jawai was recalled from the D-League on 23 March 2009.

On 9 July 2009, Jawai was traded to the Dallas Mavericks as a part of the four-team trade that also involved the Orlando Magic and Memphis Grizzlies. Later that year, on 20 October 2009, Jawai was traded to the Minnesota Timberwolves in exchange for a conditional second-round pick in the 2012 NBA draft.

On 8 November 2009, Jawai played arguably the best game of his NBA career, scoring a team-high 16 points and grabbing six rebounds in a game against the Portland Trail Blazers.

On 19 February 2010, Jawai was sent to the Sioux Falls Skyforce of the NBA D-League for a short stint. He was recalled on 21 February 2010, and sent back on 31 March 2010.

Europe

On 18 August 2010, Jawai signed a one-year deal with the Serbian team Partizan Belgrade.

In June 2011, Jawai signed a deal with the Russian team UNICS Kazan. Following the conclusion of Kazan's season, Jawai returned to Cairns and joined the Marlins for a two-game stint.

In July 2012, Jawai signed a deal with the Spanish team Barcelona Regal for the 2012–13 season.

In July 2013, Jawai signed with the Turkish team Galatasaray Liv Hospital. In October 2013, he sustained a traumatic neck injury while playing for Galatasaray. He had long-lasting effects because of the incident and temporarily couldn't see from one eye. He subsequently managed just four total games for Galatasaray in 2013–14. Despite the circumstances, Jawai re-signed with the club in September 2014. In December 2014, he left Galatasaray and signed with MoraBanc Andorra for the rest of the season.

Perth Wildcats
On 28 August 2015, Jawai signed with the Perth Wildcats for the 2015–16 NBL season. On 10 October 2015, Jawai made his debut for the Wildcats in the team's season opener, where he recorded 11 points and six rebounds in 21 minutes in a 79–66 win over the Adelaide 36ers. On 22 November 2015, he scored a season-high 20 points in a 91–90 win over his former team, the Cairns Taipans. On 21 January 2016, he had his best game in two months, scoring 18 points in a 95–72 win over the Illawarra Hawks. The Wildcats finished the regular season in second place with an 18–10 record and reached the NBL Grand Final series, where they defeated the New Zealand Breakers 2–1. Jawai appeared in 32 of the team's 34 games in 2015–16, averaging 10.3 points, 4.1 rebounds and 1.8 assists per game.

Second stint with Cairns and return to Europe
On 3 June 2016, Jawai signed a three-year deal with the Cairns Taipans, returning to the club he began his career with in 2007. A major factor in his return to Cairns was his long-time mentor and Taipans head coach Aaron Fearne. On 3 August 2016, he was ruled out for the entire NBL pre-season following finger surgery. On 5 February 2017, he scored a season-high 22 points in an 85–77 win over the Perth Wildcats.

On 10 October 2017, Jawai was ruled out for 12 weeks after suffering a partial tear of a ligament in his left foot in the Taipans' 2017–18 season opener four days earlier.

On 3 April 2018, Jawai took up his player option with the Taipans for the 2018–19 season.

On 17 February 2019, Jawai signed with French team Levallois Metropolitans for the rest of the 2018–19 Pro A season. In 14 games, he averaged 5.8 points and 2.3 rebounds per game.

On 4 August 2019, Jawai re-signed with the Taipans for the 2019–20 NBL season.

On 3 August 2020, Jawai re-signed again with the Taipans on a two-year deal.

On 9 June 2021, Jawai joined the Cairns Marlins of the NBL1 North, marking his fourth stint with the team.

Jawai missed most of February of the 2021–22 NBL season after suffering a partial Grade 2 tear of his right adductor. He parted ways with the Taipans following the season.

Darwin Salties
In May 2022, Jawai joined the Darwin Salties for their inaugural season in the NBL1 North.

In February 2023, Jawai re-signed with the Salties for the 2023 NBL1 North season.

Career statistics

NBA

Regular season

|-
| style="text-align:left;"|
| style="text-align:left;"|Toronto
| 6 || 0 || 3.2 || .250 || .000 || .000 || .3 || .0 || .0 || .0 || .3
|-
| style="text-align:left;"|
| style="text-align:left;"|Minnesota
| 39 || 2 || 10.6 || .441 || .000 || .684 || 2.7 || .6 || .3 || .2 || 3.2
|- class="sortbottom"
| style="text-align:center;" colspan="2"|Career
| 45 || 2 || 9.6 || .435 || .000 || .684 || 2.4 || .5 || .2 || .2 || 2.8

Euroleague

|-
| style="text-align:left;"|2010–11
| style="text-align:left;"|Partizan
| 16 || 7 || 22.9 || .459 || .000 || .786 || 5.0 || .9 || .6 || .7 || 9.1 || 10.7
|-
| style="text-align:left;"|2011–12
| style="text-align:left;"|UNICS
| 15 || 10 || 14.1 || .547 || .000 || .643 || 4.3 || .3 || .3 || .5 || 7.3 || 5.7 
|-
| style="text-align:left;"|2012–13
| style="text-align:left;"|Barcelona
| 30 || 6 || 15.5 || .697 || .000 || .710 || 4.7 || .4 || .3 || .8 || 7.1 || 9.1
|-
| style="text-align:left;"|2013–14
| style="text-align:left;"|Galatasaray
| 2 || 0 || 14.7 || .875 || .000 || .727 || 2.5 || .5 || .5 || .5 ||  11.0 ||  14.0 
|- class="sortbottom"
| style="text-align:center;" colspan="2"|Career
| 63 || 23 || 17.0 || .582 || .000 || .790 || 4.6 || .5 || .4 || .7 || 7.8 || 8.9

National team career
Jawai represented the Australian Boomers at the 2009 FIBA Oceania Championship and the 2014 FIBA World Cup. In November 2018, he was called up to the Boomers squad for the team's next window of 2019 FIBA World Cup qualifiers.

Personal life
Jawai is the nephew of Danny Morseu, the first Indigenous Australian to play basketball for Australia. Jawai has two daughters.

See also 
 List of foreign basketball players in Serbia

References

External links

 Nathan Jawai at taipans.com
 Nathan Jawai at wildcats.com.au
 Nathan Jawai at euroleague.net
 

1986 births
Living people
2014 FIBA Basketball World Cup players
ABA League players
Australian expatriate basketball people in Canada
Australian expatriate basketball people in France
Australian expatriate basketball people in Russia
Australian expatriate basketball people in Serbia
Australian expatriate basketball people in Spain
Australian expatriate basketball people in Turkey
Australian expatriate basketball people in the United States
Australian Institute of Sport basketball players
Australian men's basketball players
Basketball League of Serbia players
Basketball players from Sydney
BC Andorra players
Expatriate basketball people in Andorra
Cairns Taipans players
Centers (basketball)
Galatasaray S.K. (men's basketball) players
Idaho Stampede players
Indiana Pacers draft picks
Indigenous Australian basketball players
KK Partizan players
Liga ACB players
Metropolitans 92 players
Midland Chaps basketball players
Minnesota Timberwolves players
National Basketball Association players from Australia
Perth Wildcats players
Power forwards (basketball)
Sioux Falls Skyforce players
Toronto Raptors players
Torres Strait Islanders